Khanom piak pun (literally "limewater-dampened sweets") is a type of Thai dessert. It is similar in texture to khanom chan, despite being different in appearance. Khanom chan can be peeled into layers, while khanom piak pun is solid throughout.

Ingredients 
It is made with rice flour, palm sugar and precipitated limewater (น้ำปูนใส;). The word ปูน (lime) gives sweet its name. The mixture is often thickened using arrowroot or tapioca starch. As a colouring, charred coconut coir (fibre from outer husk) or crushed pandan leaves may be added. The mixture is then heated on the brass pan before allowed to set on the tray. Grated coconut may be sprinkled as desired.

Significance 
In common with other Thai desserts, Khanom piakpoon is part of religious ceremonies, such as almsgiving, house opening and funeral.

See also
 List of Thai desserts

References 

Thai desserts and snacks
Thai cuisine